Lasse Askou Mikkelsen (born 18 January 1998) is a Danish footballer who plays as a goalkeeper.

Career
In May 2014, Esbjerg fB announced that they had sold Mikkelsen to Dutch club PSV Eindhoven. Two years later, he returned to Esbjerg fB.

In June 2019, Mikkelsen joined Næstved BK in the Danish 1st Division. He started as the first choice and played the first five league games, before getting injured. Næstved then signed Mikkel Bruhn on loan as a replacement, but after Mikkelsen returned from the injury, he became the second choice. Therefore, the parties decided to terminated Mikkelsen's contract by mutual agreement on 29 November 2019.

References

Danish men's footballers
Danish expatriate men's footballers
1998 births
Living people
Esbjerg fB players
Jong PSV players
Kolding IF players
Næstved Boldklub players
Danish Superliga players
Danish 1st Division players
Danish 2nd Division players
Association football goalkeepers
Danish expatriate sportspeople in the Netherlands
Expatriate footballers in the Netherlands